James Ian Munro (born July 10, 1947) is a Canadian computer scientist. He is known for his fundamental contributions to algorithms and data structures (including optimal binary search trees, priority queues, hashing, and space-efficient data structures).

After earning a bachelor's degree in 1968 from the University of New Brunswick and a master's in 1969 from the University of British Columbia,
Munro finished his doctorate in 1971 from the University of Toronto, under the supervision of Allan Borodin. In , he formalized the notion of an implicit data structure, and has continued work in this area. He is currently a University Professor in the David R. Cheriton School of Computer Science at the University of Waterloo and the Canada Research Chair in Algorithm Design (Tier I), a research title that was first given in 2001 and was renewed most recently in 2016.

Awards and honours
Munro was elected as a member of the Royal Society of Canada in 2003. He became an ACM Fellow in 2008 for his contributions to algorithms and data structures.

In 2013 a conference was held at Waterloo in his honor, and a festschrift was published as its proceedings.

Partial bibliography

References

1947 births
Living people
Canadian computer scientists
Fellows of the Royal Society of Canada
Fellows of the Association for Computing Machinery
Theoretical computer scientists
University of New Brunswick alumni
University of British Columbia alumni
University of Toronto alumni
Academic staff of the University of Waterloo